Islands in the East China Sea include:

Matsu Islands (29.61 km²)
Beigan (Peikan)
Gaodeng Island (Kaoteng Island)
Daqiu Island
Liang Island (Lang Tao)
Xiaoqiu (Kiao Tse )
Wumingdao / Bluff Head
Qiaotou
Jinyu
Langyan
Sanlianyu / Trio Rocks
Zhongdao
Baimiao
Laoshu
Turtle Island (亀島)
Nankan (Nangan)
Dongyin (Tungyin, Tung-yin, Tungyung, Tung Yung)
Xiyin (Hsiyin, Siyin)
Zhongzhu Island
Shuangzijiao
Chukuang (Jyuguang)
Tungchu (Dongjyu, Dongquan)
Hsichu (Xijyu, Xiquan)
Yongliou
Ryukyu Islands (4,597.68 km²—Daitō Islands excluded)
Satsunan Islands
Ōsumi Islands:
Tanegashima, Yaku, Kuchinoerabu, Mageshima
Takeshima, Iōjima, Kuroshima
Tokara Islands: Kuchinoshima, Nakanoshima, Gajajima, Suwanosejima, Akusekijima, Tairajima, Kodakarajima, Takarajima
Amami Islands: Amami Ōshima, Kikaijima, Kakeromajima, Yoroshima, Ukeshima, Tokunoshima, Okinoerabujima, Yoronjima
Ryūkyū-shotō
Okinawa Islands: Okinawa Island, Kume, Iheya, Izena, Aguni, Ie (Iejima), Iwo Tori Shima (Iōtorishima)
Kerama Islands: Tokashiki, Zamami, Aka, Geruma
Sakishima Islands
Miyako Islands: Miyakojima, Ikema, Ōgami, Irabu, Shimoji, Kurima-jima, Minna, Tarama
Yaeyama Islands: Iriomote, Ishigaki, Taketomi, Kohama, Kuroshima, Aragusuku, Hatoma, Yubujima, Hateruma, Yonaguni
Senkaku Islands (7 km²)
Uotsurijima, Kuba Jima, Taisho Jima, Kita Kojima, Minami Kojima, Oki-no-Kita-Iwa, Oki-no-Minami-Iwa, Tobise
Zhoushan Archipelago (1,440.12 km²)
Zhoushan Island
Daishan Island
Liuheng Island
Jintang Island
Zhujiajian Island
Qushan Island
Mount Putuo
Jeju Island (1,849 km²)
Marado
Pengjia Islet (1.14 km²)
Mianhua Islet and Pingfong Rock
Huaping Islet

Total land area: 7,924.55 square kilometres

See also

List of islands
List of islands in the Arctic Ocean
List of islands in the Atlantic Ocean
List of islands in the Caribbean
List of islands in the Indian Ocean
List of islands of Taiwan
List of islands in the South China Sea
List of islands of Antarctica and the Southern Ocean
List of islands of Asia
List of islands of Hong Kong
List of islands of the People's Republic of China

East China Sea
 
Pacific Ocean-related lists